Clive Beltran (born 18 October 1949) is a Gibraltarian former teacher, politician and Minister of the Government of Gibraltar for the Gibraltar Social Democrats. He was principal of the Gibraltar College in 2002–2003, and was elected to the then Gibraltar House of Assembly (later became the Gibraltar Parliament) Minister for Education and Training in November 2003. Beltran retired from his position in 2011 after having served eight years in government. He also served a four-year term as Mayor of Gibraltar.

References

Gibraltarian politicians
Government ministers of Gibraltar
1949 births
Living people
Mayors of Gibraltar